The eight-lined keelback (Hebius octolineatus) is a species of snake of the family Colubridae. It is endemic to southwestern China.

Geographic range
The snake is found in Yunnan, Sichuan, Guizhou, and Guangxi provinces of China.

References 

Hebius
Snakes of China
Endemic fauna of China
Reptiles described in 1904
Taxa named by George Albert Boulenger
Taxobox binomials not recognized by IUCN